Flagellaria indica is a climbing plant found in many of the tropical and subtropical regions of the Old World, India, Bangladesh, Southeast Asia, Polynesia, and Australia.

A coiled apex of the leaf forms the holding part of the climbing plant. The fruit is inedible. The globose drupes are red when mature,  in diameter, usually with only one seed.

Because of its wide distribution, many local common names are used, such as whip vine,  hell tail, supplejack, false rattan, and bush cane.

References

 
 

Flora of Africa
Flora of China
Flora of Taiwan
Flora of tropical Asia
Flora of Australia
Flora of the Pacific
Plants described in 1753
Taxa named by Carl Linnaeus
Poales